İsmail Fenni Ertuğrul (1855–1946) was a Turkish writer and westernist thinker.

References 

2. Amcu - 20th Century Turkey

1855 births
1946 deaths
Turkish writers
People from Veliko Tarnovo
20th-century Turkish politicians